Donnan can refer to:

Donnan (surname)
 Donnan, Iowa, a community in the United States
 Donnán of Eigg, Gaelic priest of the 7th century
 Donnan equilibrium
 Donnan potential